NGC 1858 (also known as ESO 56-SC74) is a bright, large, irregular open cluster and emission nebula. It is found in the Dorado constellation. It is located in the Large Magellanic Cloud. It was first discovered by James Dunlop on August 3, 1826, and was first recorded as Dunlop 120. John Herschel recorded it on November 2, 1834. However, at the time, he did not associate it with Dunlop 120. Astronomers have now realised that Dunlop 120 and NGC 1858 are the same object.

References

External links
 

Open clusters
Dorado (constellation)
Emission nebulae
ESO objects
1858
Astronomical objects discovered in 1826
Large Magellanic Cloud